The Mansfield–Bucyrus, OH Combined Statistical Area is a CSA in the U.S. state of Ohio, as defined by the United States Census Bureau. It consists of the Mansfield Metropolitan Statistical Area (Richland County); and the Bucyrus Micropolitan Statistical Area (Crawford County). As of the 2000 Census, the Combined Statistical Area had a population of 175,818, but according to a US Census 2009 estimate, the CSA has a population of 167,893 residents.

This area also has a strong commuter interchange with Cleveland and Columbus and their metropolitan areas.

All communities and townships

Richland County
The Mansfield Metropolitan Area includes the cities of Mansfield, Ontario, and Shelby. It also includes the villages of Bellville, Butler, Lexington, Lucas, Plymouth, and Shiloh. An unincorporated community that is also included is Olivesburg. Townships that are also included are Blooming Grove, Butler, Cass, Franklin, Jackson, Jefferson, Madison, Mifflin, Monroe, Perry, Plymouth, Sandusky, Sharon, Springfield, Troy, Washington, Weller, and Worthington.

Crawford County
The Bucyrus Micropolitan Area includes the cities of Bucyrus, Galion, and Crestline. It also includes the villages of Chatfield, New Washington, North Robinson, and Tiro. Unincorporated communities that are also included are Brokensword, Oceola, and Sulphur Springs. Townships that are also included are Auburn, Bucyrus, Chatfield, Cranberry, Dallas, Holmes, Jackson, Jefferson, Liberty, Lykens, Polk, Sandusky, Texas, Tod, Vernon, and Whetstone.

Demographics

References

 List of USCB CSA definitions
 Map, Cleveland State University (PDF)

Metropolitan areas of Ohio
Combined statistical areas of the United States